Two athletes from Australia competed at the 1904 Summer Olympics in St. Louis, United States. Although this was the third games at which athletes from Australia participated, it was the first time those athletes competed representing the Commonwealth of Australia, which had come into existence at Federation in 1901.

Traditionally, it was believed that either one or two Australians had competed in the games, with neither winning medals. However, in 2009 it came to light that Frank Gailey, who later immigrated to the United States and became an American citizen, had not yet done so when he competed in the Games. Gailey won three silver medals and one bronze medal in swimming.

Medalists

Athletics

Track & road events

Field events

Swimming

References

External links
Official Olympic Reports

Nations at the 1904 Summer Olympics
1904
Olympics